This is a list of chapters of the manga series Tenjho Tenge written and illustrated by Oh! great. It was serialized in the Japanese monthly manga magazine Ultra Jump by the publisher Shueisha between 1997 and 2010. About twice a year, Shueisha compiled six or more of Tenjho Tenges chapters into tankōbon volumes. Individual chapters are called "fights". The 136 chapters were published into 22 volumes between May 19, 1998 and November 19, 2010.

Tenjho Tenge was licensed for English language publication by CMX, which was an imprint of DC Comics. Beginning with the first on February 16, 2005, they released eighteen heavily censored volumes in North America before the company was shut down in July 2010. In November 2010, Viz Media acquired the rights to the Tenjho Tenge manga and stated that their version would be 100% uncut and faithful to the original Japanese. From June 21, 2011, to February 5, 2013, they released the series bi-monthly in eleven 2-in-1 volumes, which collects two individual volumes into a single large one. Viz's releases also includes omake, color pages from the series's original run in Ultra Jump, and since each release will cover two volumes, the second cover will be printed in as a color page.

The story primarily focuses on the members of the Juken Club and their opposition, the Executive Council, which is the ruling student body of a high school that educates its students in the art of combat. As the story unfolds, both groups become increasingly involved with an ongoing battle that has been left unresolved for four hundred years.



Volume list

References

External links
 Tenjho Tenge manga official website 
 Tenjho Tenge cmx manga website
 

Chapters
Tenjho Tenge